The .348 Winchester is an American rifle cartridge. It was introduced in 1936, and developed for the Winchester Model 71 lever action rifle. The .348 was one of the most powerful rimmed rounds ever used in a lever action rifle.

Performance
It is excellent for any North American big game in woods or brush, if the 250 grain bullet is used, but not especially suited to long range (400 yards and beyond) as a result of the need to use flat-nose slugs due to the Model 71's tubular magazine. The  loadings are preferred for anything past .

In 1962, Winchester dropped the factory 150 gr and 250 gr loads, retaining only the 200 gr. No other rifle was ever offered in .348 by Winchester (although Uberti has made some 400 rifles chambered for the .348 in the Cimarron 1885 Hi-Wall in 2005-06), and it has been supplanted by the .358 Winchester (in the Model 88). (The Model 71 was discontinued in 1958.)

In 1987 Browning produced a modern version of the Model 71 in Japan.  These have different thread sizes in places, most notably the barrels, and many parts will not interchange with the originals.  The Browning version was a limited production model only.

The case of the .348 was used to produce the 8-348w wildcat, used to rechamber World War 1-era rifles such as Lebel or Berthier, instead of the original 8x50mmR, which at the time of such conversions were still considered war materiel in France and therefore strictly regulated. The .348 is also the basis for the .348 Ackley Improved, The .348  Ackley improved has about a 200 fps advantage over the standard  pushing the 200 grain FTX bullet at 2800 feet a second with some of the new hybrid powders. The .348 also served as the basis for the .50 Alaskan and .500 Linebaugh cartridges.

Dimensions
SAAMI rates the standard pressure of the cartridge at 40,000 CUP.  The C.I.P rates the max standard pressure at a "Pmax = 3200 bar" or 46,412 psi.

See also
List of cartridges by caliber
List of rifle cartridges
Table of handgun and rifle cartridges
9mm caliber

References

External links

 The Winchester 71 and .348 Winchester Cartridge
 The .348 Winchester
 .348 Win. vs .358 Win.
 The Model 71 Winchester and the .348 WCF Cartridge

Pistol and rifle cartridges
Winchester Repeating Arms Company cartridges